"Bodyswap" is the fourth episode of science fiction sitcom Red Dwarf Series III, and the sixteenth overall. It premiered on the British television channel BBC2 on 5 December 1989. Written by Rob Grant and Doug Naylor, and directed by Ed Bye. This was the first episode to be recorded without a live studio audience. The plot has Rimmer suggesting that the perfect way to help Lister get "healthy" is swapping bodies. The episode was re-mastered, along with the rest of the first three series, in 1998.

Plot
A malfunctioning skutter runs amok and rewires Red Dwarfs circuitry. Despite Arnold Rimmer being concerned about what any machine might be connected to, Dave Lister ignores his warnings not to touch any machinery and makes an order at a snack machine, inadvertently triggering the ship's self-destruct mechanism. As the self-destruct can only be over-ridden by a senior officer, all of whom are dead, Kryten performs a mind-swap on Lister, temporarily placing the mind of a female officer of suitable rank who can over-ride the self-destruct. Although this fails, the group find that the scutter only connected the vending machine to the self-destruct countdown and not the ship's self-destruct bomb, when it vends Lister's order. They are soon left annoyed when Holly admits to having removed the bomb years ago and failed to notify anyone of this.

Following the experience, the mind-swap experiment soon gives Rimmer an idea on how to be able to enjoy life again. He promptly convinces Lister to swap bodies with him for two weeks, offering to get his body back into shape. Lister soon regrets the decision when Rimmer abuses his body by overindulging himself in the pleasures he had been denied for so long, thus failing to uphold his end of the bargain. Although Lister recovers his body, Rimmer coerces Kryten to chloroform him so he can reacquire it. Angered by what he did, Lister, along with Cat and Kryten, pursue after Rimmer when he absconds in a Starbug with a full freight of junk food. The chase causes Rimmer to crash, whereupon he is forced to return Lister his body. Some time later, Lister notices Rimmer acting strangely when he enters their quarters, and discovers that he has swapped bodies with Cat with Kryten's help again, unable to assure the pair how long he will use Cat's body for.

Production
This was the first episode to be recorded without the live studio audience. Technical difficulties of the actors playing other characters meant that the scenes would have to have been done twice. Instead the voices were dubbed over the scenes in post-production and trying to match up with lip movements caused much mirth while recording. Chris Barrie, being an impressionist, had no problems playing Lister, whereas Craig's portrayal as Rimmer was not as smooth. The final edit, with dubbed voices, was then played to a small audience to provide the laughter track.

The long chase sequence with Blue Midget and Starbug was overseen by effects supervisor Peter Wragg. Using his experience of working on shows such as Thunderbirds, he had the model ships of Starbug and Blue Midget flying on hidden wires over a scaled landscape, Starbug eventually crashing into it.

This episode has the only mention of the ship White Midget. This was a mistake on the part of the writers. In the Remastered version, Lister's voice is dubbed over so he says "The Midget" instead of "White Midget". Originally the new smaller ship that would be used was White Midget, a similar version of the Blue Midget, but then Starbug was created, which would be bigger and allow for more room to film inside.

The large interior areas of Red Dwarf were filmed inside Padiham Power Station.

Cultural references
Alfred Hitchcock is referenced by Rimmer when describing Lister's silhouette. While using the toilet with Lister's body, Rimmer hums The Grand Old Duke of York tune to himself. It is from this experience that Rimmer references Star Trek'''s Spock when describing Lister's urine. Rimmer also recites Clint Eastwood's line from Sudden Impact.

Reception
The episode was originally broadcast on the British television channel BBC2 on 5 December 1989 in the 9:00pm evening time slot.

Remastering

The remastering of Series I to III was carried out during the late 1990s. General changes throughout the series included replacement of the opening credits, giving the picture a colour grade and filmising, computer generated special effects of Red Dwarf and many more visual and audio enhancements.

Changes made specific to "Bodyswap" include the Starbug and Blue Midget'' chase scenes have been replaced with a CGI sequence. The scene with Rimmer, as Cat, playing around with food has been added to the ending.

Notes

See also
 Body swap, for numerous other fictional examples of the concept

References

External links

Series III episode guide at www.reddwarf.co.uk

Red Dwarf III episodes
1989 British television episodes
Fiction about body swapping